"Gettin' Off on You" is a song by American R&B/hip-hop singer Joya, released as the second single from her debut album Here I Am. The single peaked at number sixty-seven on the US Billboard R&B Singles chart, and spent two weeks at number-one on the Billboards Bubbling Under R&B Singles chart, where it debuted at number-one.

Track listing
US CD, Maxi Single

Notes
The "Gettin' Off on You" remixes were produced by Edward "Eddie F" Ferrell.

Charts

References

External links
Joya Bio|Facebook.com

1995 singles
Joya (singer) songs
1995 songs